Sri Lanka is a tropical island situated close to the southern tip of India. The diversity of fish fauna within the inland waterways and around the island is very high considering the small size of the island.

Class Chondrichthyes - Cartilage fishes
Among the marine fishes, sharks and batoids (rays and skates) form a considerable diversity. A preliminary checklist of sharks around Sri Lanka was compiled by marine biologist, ornithologist, astronomer and well known diver Rex I. De Silva in 1985. It is cited as the first most comprehensive catalogue to Sri Lankan cartilage fishes. On 2016 May, he published the Illustrated Guide of Sharks of Sri Lanka. According to De Silva, there are 60 sharks species and 30 rays and skates found around the coast of Sri Lanka.

Sharks are a group of fish characterized by a cartilaginous skeleton, five to seven gill slits on the sides of the head, and pectoral fins that are not fused to the head. Modern sharks are classified within the clade Selachimorpha (or Selachii) and are the sister group to the rays.

The following list of shark species recorded from the territorial waters of Sri Lanka.

Order Hexanchiformes - primitive sharks

Family Hexanchidae - cow sharks

Order Squaliformes

Family Centrophoridae - gulper sharks

Family Dalatiidae - kitefin sharks

Family Echinorhinidae - bramble sharks

Family Somniosidae - sleeper sharks

Order Orectolobiformes - carpet sharks

Family Hemiscylliidae - bamboo sharks

Family Stegostomatidae

Family Ginglymostomatidae - nurse sharks

Family Rhincodontidae

Order Lamniformes - mackerel sharks

Family Alopiidae - thresher sharks

Family Odontaspididae - sand sharks

Family Pseudocarchariidae

Family Lamnidae - white sharks

Family Megachasmidae - megamouth

Order Carcharhiniformes - ground sharks

Family Scyliorhinidae - catsharks

Family Proscylliidae - finback catsharks

Family Triakidae - houndsharks

Family Hemigaleidae - weasel sharks

Family Carcharhinidae - requiem sharks

Family Sphyrnidae - hammerhead sharks

Batoidea is a superorder of cartilaginous fish commonly known as batoids or rays, but it also includes the skates and sawfishes. Approximately 560 species are described in thirteen families. Batoids are in the fish subclass Elasmobranchii along with sharks, as they are closely related. Rays are distinguished by their flattened bodies, enlarged pectoral fins that are fused to the head, and gill slits that are placed on their ventral surfaces.

The following list of rays and skates species recorded from the territorial waters of Sri Lanka.

Order Pristiformes

Family Pristidae - carpenter sharks

Order Torpediniformes - electric rays

Family Narkidae - sleeper rays

Order Myliobatiformes - sting rays

Family Myliobatidae - eagle rays

Family Dasyatidae - whiptail stingrays

Family Gymnuridae - butterfly rays

Subfamily Mobulidae - devil rays

References

 http://www.divesrilanka.com/Fauna-Sharks.html
De Silva, R. I. 2015. The Sharks of Sri Lanka. Colombo. Field Ornithology Group of Sri Lanka. https://sites.google.com/site/booksharksofsrilanka/home/
Ebert, D.A., De Silva, R.I. and Goonewardene, M. First Record  of a Dwarf False Catshark (Carcharhiniformes" Pseudotriakidae) from Sri Lanka. LORIS 27 (5 and 6) pp. 63–64.

Fauna of Sri Lanka
 List, cartilaginous
Cartilaginous fish
Sri Lanka